Mā Shā’ Allāh ibn Athari (c. 740–815 AD) was an 8th century Persian Jewish  astrologer, astronomer, and mathematician. Originally from Khorasan he lived in Basra (present day Iraq) during the reigns of al-Manṣūr and al-Ma’mūn, and was among those who introduced astrology and astronomy to Baghdad in the late 8th and early 9th century. The bibliographer ibn al-Nadim in his  Fihrist, described him "as virtuous and in his time a leader in the science of jurisprudence, i.e. the science of judgments of the stars". He served as a court astrologer for the Abbasid Caliphate and wrote numerous works on astrology in Arabic. Some Latin translations survive.

The Arabic phrase  indicates a believer's acceptance of God's ordainment of good or ill fortune. His name is probably an Arabic rendering of Hebrew Shiluh, which is referenced in Genesis 49:10. Al-Nadim writes Mashallah's name Mīshā, meaning Yithru "Jethro".  Latin translators called him many variants such as Messahala, Messahalla, Messala, Macellama, Macelarma, Messahalah, etc.

The crater Messala on the Moon is named after him.

Biography

As a young man Mashallah participated in the founding of Baghdad for Caliph al-Manṣūr in 762 by working with a group of astrologers led by Naubakht the Persian to pick an electional horoscope for the founding of the city and building of an observatory.  Attributed the author of over 20 titles, predominantly on astrology, his authority was established over the centuries in the Middle East, and later in the West, when horoscopic astrology was transmitted to Europe from the 12th century. His writings include both what would be recognized as traditional horary astrology and an earlier type of astrology which casts consultation charts to divine the client's intention. The strong influence of Hermes Trismegistus and Dorotheus is evident in his work.

Works Listed in Kitab al-Fihrist
The Big Book of Births  (14vols); The Twenty-One On Conjunctions, Religions and Sects; The Projection of [Astrological] Rays; The Meaning; Construction and Operation of Astrolabes; The Armillary Sphere; Rains and Winds; The Two Arrows; Book known as The Seventh & Decimal (Ch.1 - The Beginning of Actions; Ch.2 - Averting What Is Predestined;  Ch.3 - On Questions; Ch.4 - Testimonies of the Stars; Ch.5 - Happenings; Ch.6 Movement and Indications of the Two Luminaries [sun & moon]); The Letters; The Sultan; The Journey; Preceptions; Nativities; Revolution (Transfer) of the Years of Nativities; Governments (Dynasties) and Sects; Prediction (Judgement) Based on Conjunctions and Oppositions; The Sick; Predictions (Judgements) Based On Constellations (Ṣūr)();
Mashallah's treatise De mercibus (On Prices) is the oldest known scientific work extant in Arabic  and the only work of his extant in its original Arabic. Multiple translations into medieval Latin,  Byzantine Greek and Hebrew were made. 

One of Mashallah's most popular works in the Middle Ages was a cosmological treatise This comprehensive account of the cosmos along Aristotelian lines, covers many topics important to early cosmology. Postulating a ten-orb universe it strays from traditional cosmology. Mashallah aimed at the lay reader and illustrated his main ideas with comprehensible diagrams. Two versions of the manuscript were printed: a short version (27 chapters) , and an expanded version (40 chapters) . The short version was translated by Gherardo Cremonese (Gerard of Cremona). Both were printed in Nuremberg, in 1504 and 1549, respectively.

Chaucer's source for his astrolabe treatise 
Mashallah's treatise on the astrolabe (p 10) is the first known of its kind. Later translated from Arabic into Latin . The  exact source of Geoffrey Chaucer's Treatise on the Astrolabe (1391) in Middle English is undetermined but most of his ‘conclusions’ go back, directly or indirectly, to a Latin translation of Mashallah's work, called  . Chaucer's description of the instrument amplifies Mashallah’s, and his indebtedness was recognised by John Selden in 1613  and established by Walter William Skeat. Skeat's Treatise of the Astrolabe includes a collotype MS facsimile of the Latin version of the second part of Mashallah’s work, which parallels Chaucer's. This is also found in R. T. Gunther's, Chaucer and Messahala on Astrology.
De elementis et orbibus was included in Gregor Reisch's  (ed. pr., Freiburg, 1503; Suter says the text is included in the Basel edition of 1583). Its contents primarily deal with the construction and usage of an astrolabe.

In 1981, Paul Kunitzsch argued that the treatise on the astrolabe long attributed to Mashallah is in fact written by Ibn al-Saffar.

Texts & Translations

On Conjunctions, Religions, and People was an astrological world history based on conjunctions of Jupiter and Saturn. A few fragments are extant as quotations by the Christian astrologer Ibn Hibinta.

Liber Messahallaede revoltione liber annorum mundi, a work on revolutions, and De rebus eclipsium et de conjunctionibus planetarum in revolutionibus annorm mundi, a work on eclipses.

Nativities under its Arabic title Kitab al - Mawalid, has been partially translated into English from a Latin translation of the Arabic

On Reception is available in English from the Latin edition by Joachim Heller of Nuremberg in 1549.
Other astronomical and astrological writings are quoted by Suter and Steinschneider.

An Irish astronomical tract appears based in part on a medieval Latin version of Mashallah. Two-thirds of tract are part-paraphrase part-translation. 

The 12th-century scholar and astrologer Abraham ibn Ezra translated two of Mashallah's astrological treatises into Hebrew: She'elot and Ḳadrut (Steinschneider, "Hebr. Uebers." pp. 600–603). 

Eleven modern translations of Mashallah's astrological treatises have been translated out of Latin into English.

Philosophy
Mashallah postulated a ten-orb universe rather than the eight-orb model offered by Aristotle and the nine-orb model that was popular in his time. In all Mashallah's planetary model ascribes 26 orbs to the universe , which account for the relative positioning and motion of the seven planets. Of the ten orbs, the first seven contain the planets and the eighth contain the fixed stars. The ninth and tenth orbs were named by Mashallah the "Orb of Signs" and the "Great Orb", respectively. Both of these orbs are starless and move with the diurnal motion, but the tenth orb moves in the plane of the celestial equator while the ninth orb moves around poles that are inclined 24° with respect to the poles of the tenth orb. The ninth is also divided into twelve parts which are named after the zodiacal constellations that can be seen beneath them in the eighth orb. The eight and ninth orbs move around the same poles, but with different motion. The ninth orb moves with daily motion, so that the 12 signs are static with
respect to the equinoxes, the eighth Orb of the Fixed Stars moves 1° in 100 years, so that the 12 zodiacal constellations are mobile with respect to the equinoxes. The eight and ninth orbs moving around the same poles also guarantees that the 12 stationary signs and the 12 mobile zodiacal constellations overlap. By describing the universe in such a manner, Mashallah was attempting to demonstrate the natural reality
of the 12 signs by stressing that the stars are located with respect to the signs and that fundamental natural phenomena, such as the beginning of the seasons, changes of weather, and the passage of the months, take place in the sublunar domain when the sun enters the signs of the ninth orb .

Mashallah was an advocate of the idea that the conjunctions of Saturn and Jupiter dictate the timing of important events on Earth. These conjunctions, which occur about every twenty years, take place in the same triplicity for about two hundred years, and special significance is attached to a shift to another triplicity.

Bibliography

 De cogitatione
 Epistola de rebus eclipsium et conjunctionibus planetarum (distinct from De magnis conjunctionibus by Abu Ma'shar al Balkhi ; Latin translation : John of Sevilla Hispalenis et Limiensis
 De revolutionibus annorum mundi
 De significationibus planetarum in nativitate
 Liber receptioni
 Works of Sahl and Masha'allah, trans. Benjamin Dykes, Cazimi Press, Golden Valley, MN, 2008.
 Masha'Allah, On Reception, trans. Robert Hand, ARHAT Publications, Reston, VA, 1998.

See also

Liber de orbe
Astrology in medieval Islam
Jewish views of astrology
List of Persian scientists and scholars

References
Footnotes

Citations

Bibliography

External links
  (PDF version)
Blog, History of Science Collections, University of Oklahoma Libraries Pseudo-Masha’Allah, On the Astrolabe, ed. Ron B. Thomson, version 1.0 (Toronto, 2012); A Critical Edition of the Latin Text with English Translation by Ron B. Thomson.

8th-century births
810s deaths
8th-century Arabic writers
8th-century astrologers
8th-century Iranian astronomers
8th-century Jews
8th-century Iranian mathematicians
9th-century Iranian astronomers
9th-century Jews
9th-century astrologers
9th-century Arabic writers
Astronomers from the Abbasid Caliphate
Astronomers of the medieval Islamic world
Jewish astronomers
Court scholars
Jews from the Abbasid Caliphate
Medieval Jewish astrologers
Medieval Jewish astronomers
People from Basra
Medieval Iranian astrologers
Medieval Persian Jews
9th-century Iranian mathematicians
8th-century people from the Abbasid Caliphate
9th-century people from the Abbasid Caliphate